The Beely-Johnson American Legion Post 139 is a historic meeting hall at 200 North Spring Street in Springdale, Arkansas.  It is a single-story vernacular structure, built out of rough-cut stone laid in irregular courses, and topped by a gable roof.  The building is one of the few remaining stone buildings on Springdale.  It was built in 1934 with locally raised funding after a grant proposal to the Civil Works Administration, a federal government jobs program, was rejected.  The building has served as a meeting point for a large number of local civic organizations, and has been used as a polling place.

The building was listed on the National Register of Historic Places in 2007 for its architecture and role in the area's social history.

References

American Legion buildings
Cultural infrastructure completed in 1934
Buildings and structures in Springdale, Arkansas
Clubhouses on the National Register of Historic Places in Arkansas
National Register of Historic Places in Washington County, Arkansas
1934 establishments in Arkansas